Božidar Tadić  (born 14 July 1983) is a Serbian former footballer who played as a midfielder.

Club career
Tadic previously played for FK Obilić in the First League of Serbia and Montenegro. In 2006, he played abroad in the Beta Ethniki with Panserraikos F.C.In the 2007-08 season he assisted the team in securing promotion to the Super League Greece after winning the league. After a season in the top flight Panserraikos were relegated, but returned in the 2010-11 season. In 2011, he played in Beta Ethniki with OFI Crete F.C., and Veria F.C.

In 2012, he returned to Panserraikos, and later played with Niki Volos F.C. In 2013, he signed with Episkopi F.C., and returned for a third stint with Panserraikos in 2014. In 2015, he played in the Gamma Ethniki with A.E. Sparti F.C., and had stints with Aiginiakos F.C., Rodos F.C., Elpis Skoutari F.C., Doxa Vyronas F.C., and Serres 1800. In 2019, he played in the Canadian Soccer League with the Serbian White Eagles FC.

References

External sources
 
 Božidar Tadić at Dekisa.Tripod

1983 births
Living people
Sportspeople from Loznica
Serbian footballers
Serbian expatriate footballers
FK Loznica players
FK Mladi Obilić players
FK Obilić players
Panserraikos F.C. players
Serbian White Eagles FC players
Canadian Soccer League (1998–present) players
Expatriate footballers in Greece
Serbian expatriate sportspeople in Greece
Association football wingers
OFI Crete F.C. players
Veria F.C. players
Niki Volos F.C. players
Episkopi F.C. players
A.E. Sparta P.A.E. players
Rodos F.C. players
First League of Serbia and Montenegro players
Football League (Greece) players
Super League Greece players
Gamma Ethniki players
Doxa Vyronas F.C. players